Cheng Weishi Lun (CWSL, Sanskrit reconstruction: *Vijñapti-mātratā-siddhi, English: The Demonstration of Consciousness-only, Taisho Catalog number 1585), is a comprehensive treatise on the philosophy of Yogacara Buddhism and a commentary on Vasubandhu's seminal work, the Triṃśikā-vijñaptimātratā (Thirty Verses on Consciousness-only). 

The CWSL was written by the early Tang dynasty monk Xuanzang (602–664), who drew on the commentarial work of 10 different Indian Yogacara scholars as well as his experience of studying under the Indian Yogacara master Śīlabhadra in Nalanda University.

Overview

When Xuanzang was studying Buddhism in India at Nālandā University, he studied ten commentaries on Vasubandhu's Triṃśikā-vijñaptimātratā. Back in China, Xuanzang drew upon these commentaries, especially the commentary of master Dharmapāla, to write a detailed explanation of Vasubandhu's Triṃśikā-vijñaptimātratā. This synthetic commentary became the Cheng Weishi Lun.

According to Francis Cook, The theory of the Ch’eng wei-shih lun is that basic or fundamental consciousness (mula-vijñana) comes to appear naturally and spontaneously in the form of a seeing part (darsana-bhaga) and a seen part (nimitta-bhaga). The seeming reality of an inner self perceiving external events is nothing more than one aspect of consciousness perceiving itself in the form of images. A third part of consciousness, the manas, or thinking aspect, interprets the two parts as a self and an external world. This situation is also the basis for hatred, craving, fear, and other passions. In fact, the apparently real external world of things is nothing but internal images perceived by consciousness and grasped as a source of attachment by thought.The Chéng Wéishì Lùn became one of the key texts of East Asian Yogācāra, both by Chinese ("Faxiang") and Japanese ("Hossō") thinkers. It is a major doctrinal source and summa for this tradition, also known as the Consciousness Only School (Wéishí-zōng).

Kuiji, one of Xuanzang's key pupils, wrote a commentary on the CWSL, called the Chéng Wéishì Lùn Shuji (成唯識 論述記; Taishō no. 1830, vol. 43, 229a-606c). Kuiji's commentary relies on the epistemology of Dignāga and remains focused on an orthodox Yogacara interpretation.

The Korean monk Woncheuk, another influential pupil of Xuanzang, wrote his own commentary, the Chéng Wéishì Lùn Ceshu, which disagrees with several of Kuiji's positions. Woncheuk was a follower of the Shelun school (攝論宗) of Yogacara, which draws on the work of Paramārtha (499-569). This tradition defended Parāmartha's teaching that there was a ninth consciousness called the "pure consciousness" (amalavijñāna). This position had been rejected by Xuanzang and Kuiji.

Another student of Xuanzang, the Japanese monk Dōshō (道昭, 629–700 C.E.) brought the CWSL to Japan in 660, creating the doctrinal foundation for the Japanese Consciousness-only (Jp: Hossō) school at Nara's Gangōji Temple.

English translations
The Chinese scholar and philosopher Wei Tat translated the Chéng Wéishì Lùn into English for the first time in Hong Kong in 1973. He drew on various Chinese and Western sources for his research, especially the French translation of the CWSL by Louis de La Vallée Poussin. Poussin's translation also included numerous annotations and passages from Kuiji's commentary.

Francis Cook made a new English translation for the Numata Center for Buddhist Translation and Research's Taishō Tripiṭaka translation effort.

In 2017, a new translation closely based on Louis de La Vallée Poussin's French (along with many annotations) was published by Motilal Banarsidass as Vijñapti-mātratā-siddhi: A Commentary (Chéng Wéishì Lùn) on Vasubandhu's Triṃśikā by Xuanzang. It is the work of Lodrö Sangpo, Migme Chödrön and A. L. Mayer. 

Peter Lunde Johnson has published a translation that is entitled "On Realizing There is Only The Virtual Nature of Consciousness" in 2019.

See also
 East Asian Yogācāra
 Kuiji

References

Bibliography
 Lusthaus, Dan (2003). Buddhist Phenomenology: A Philosophical Investigation of Yogacara Buddhism and the Ch'eng Wei-shih Lun, Routledge Critical Studies in Buddhism, 
 Schmithausen, Lambert (2015). On the Problem of the External World in the Ch’eng wei shih lun, International Institute for Buddhist Studies
 Sharf, Robert (2016). Is Yogacara Phenomenology? Some Evidence from the Cheng Weishi Lun. Journal of Indian Philosophy 44 (4), 777–807
 Jiang, Tao (2005). "Alayavijnana" and the problematic of continuity in the "Cheng Wei-shih Lun", Journal of Indian Philosophy 33 (3), 243-284

External links
 Epstein, Ronald. 1985.  The Transformation of Consciousness into Wisdom in the Chinese Consciousness-Only School According to the Cheng Wei-Shi Lun. 
羅時憲 : 唯識方隅
excerpt--The Treatise on the Establishment of the Doctrine of Consciousness-Only
 Johnson, Peter Lunde, trans. (2018),  The Discourse On Realizing There is Only The Virtual Nature of Consciousness (Vijñapti Matratā Siddhi, 成唯識論) 

Mahayana texts
Abhidharma
Yogacara
Tang dynasty literature
7th-century Chinese books